Grant is an English, Scottish, and French surname derived from the French graund meaning 'tall' or 'large'. It was originally a nickname given to those with remarkable size.

Notable people with the surname "Grant" include

A
Aaron Grant (1908–1966), American football player
Abbi Grant (born 1995), Scottish footballer
Abiola Grant (born 2002), Barbadian footballer
Abraham P. Grant (1804–1871), American politician
Adam Grant (born 1981), American psychologist
Adele Gerard Lewis Grant (1881–1969), American botanist
Adrian Grant (disambiguation), multiple people
African Grant (born 1965), American football player
A. K. Grant (1941–2000), New Zealand writer
Alan Grant (disambiguation), multiple people
Albert Grant (disambiguation), multiple people
Albie Grant (1943–2004), American basketball player
Alec Grant (1893–1966), New Zealand cricketer
Alexander Grant (disambiguation), multiple people
Alexandra Grant (born 1973), American visual artist
Alfred Ernest Albert Grant (1861–1933), English naval officer
Alick Grant (1916–2008), English footballer
Alison Grant (born 1961), New Zealand footballer
Alistair Grant (1937–2001), British businessman
Allean Grant (born 1983), Caymanian footballer
Allie Grant (born 1994), American actress
Amy Grant (born 1960), American singer-songwriter
Amy Grant (politician), American politician
Andrew Grant (disambiguation), multiple people
Andy Grant (born 1984), Saint Vincentian runner
Angela Grant (born 1950), British actress
Ann Grant (born 1955), Zimbabwean field hockey player
Anne Grant (1755–1838), Scottish poet
Anthony Grant (disambiguation), multiple people
Archibald Grant (disambiguation), multiple people
Archie Grant (1904–1970), New Zealand railway worker
Arthur Grant (disambiguation), multiple people
Asahel Grant (1807–1844), American missionary
Audrey Grant (born 1940), Canadian bridge player
Avram Grant (born 1955), Israeli football manager

B
Bakari Grant (born 1987), American football player
Barbara Grant, American businesswoman
Barra Grant (born 1948), American actress
Ben Grant (disambiguation), multiple people
Benny Grant (1908–1991), Canadian ice hockey player
Bernard Grant (1920–2004), American actor
Bernhard Grant (1887–1966), British philatelist
Bernie Grant (1944–2000), British politician
Bernie Grant (footballer) (born 1962), Scottish footballer
Bert Grant (1878–1951), American composer
Beryl Grant (1921–2017), Australian nurse
Beth Grant (born 1949), American actress
Betty Jean Grant, American politician
Bev Grant (born 1942), American musician
Beverly Grant (disambiguation), multiple people
Bill Grant (disambiguation), multiple people
Bisa Grant (born 1976), American athlete
Blanche Grant (1874–1948), American artist
Bob Grant (disambiguation), multiple people
Boyd Grant (1933–2020), American basketball player and coach
Brad Grant, Canadian trucking magnate
Brea Grant (born 1981), American actress
Brian Grant (disambiguation), multiple people
Britt Grant (born 1978), American attorney
Bruce Grant (disambiguation), multiple people
Bryan Grant (1909–1986), American tennis player
Buck Grant (ice hockey) (1894–1982), Canadian ice hockey player
Bud Grant (1927–2023), American football player and coach
Bud Grant (broadcaster) (1932–2011), American television executive
Bunny Grant (1940–2018), Jamaican boxer

C
Calvin A. Grant (born 1970), American ophthalmologist
Cameron Grant (born 1970), Canadian swimmer
Carrie Grant (born 1965), English voice coach
Carson Grant (born 1950), American actor
Cary Grant (1904–1986), British–American actor
Cecil Grant (1870–1946), English academic administrator
Chapman Grant (1887–1983), American biologist
Charles Grant (disambiguation), multiple people
Charlotte Grant (born 2001), Australian footballer
Chasity Grant (born 2001), Dutch footballer
Chet Grant (1892–1985), American football player
Christine Grant (disambiguation), multiple people
Christopher Grant (disambiguation), multiple people
Ciara Grant (disambiguation), multiple people
Cie Grant (born 1979), American football player
Clare Grant (born 1979), American actress
Claudius B. Grant (1835–1921), American jurist
Clifford Grant (1930–2021), Australian opera singer
Clint Grant (1916–2010), American photographer
Colesworthey Grant (1813–1880), English artist
Colin Grant (disambiguation), multiple people
Colquhoun Grant (disambiguation), multiple people
Conor Grant (disambiguation), multiple people
Coreen Grant (born 1998), Scottish rugby union footballer
Corey Grant (born 1976), Canadian football player
Corey Grant (running back) (born 1991), American football player
Corinne Grant (born 1973), Australian comedian
Cornelius Grant (born 1943), American guitarist
Corrie Grant (1850–1924), British politician
Craig Grant (1968–2021), American poet
Crystal Celeste Grant (born 1980), American actress
Cuthbert Grant (1793–1854), Canadian politician
Cy Grant (1919–2010), Guyanese actor
Cynthia Grant, Canadian scientist
Cynthia Grant (director), Canadian theatre director

D
Dalton Grant (born 1966), British high jumper
Dalton Grant (rugby league) (born 1990), Welsh rugby league footballer
Daniel Grant (disambiguation), multiple people
Danny Grant (ice hockey) (1946–2019), Canadian ice hockey player
Darlene Grant, American academic administrator
Darren Grant, American music producer
Darren Grant (footballer) (born 1963), Australian rules footballer
Darryl Grant (born 1959), American football player
Davey Grant (born 1985), English mixed martial artist
Davie Grant (1860–1903), Scottish golfer
David Grant (disambiguation), multiple people
Deborah Grant (born 1947), English actress
Deborah Grant (artist) (born 1968), Canadian-American artist
DeLawrence Grant (born 1979), American football player
Delroy Grant (born 1957), Jamaican rapist
Deon Grant (born 1979), American football player
Derek Grant (disambiguation), multiple people
Derick K. Grant (born 1973), American tap dancer
Derrick Grant (born 1938), Scottish rugby union footballer
Dick Grant (1870–1956), Canadian runner
Donald Grant (disambiguation), multiple people
Doran Grant (born 1992), American football player
Doris Grant (1905–2003), British nutritionist
Dorothy Grant, Haida fashion designer
Doug Grant (disambiguation), multiple people
Douglas Grant (1885–1951), Australian soldier
Duncan Grant (1885–1978), Scottish painter
Dwight Grant (born 1984), American mixed martial artist
Dwinell Grant (1912–1991), American visual artist

E
Earl Grant (1931–1970), American pianist
Earl Grant (basketball) (born 1976), American basketball coach
Ebenezer Grant (1882–1962), English footballer
Eddy Grant (born 1948), Guyanese-British musician
Edith Jacqueline Ingram Grant (1942–2020), American judge
Edward Grant (disambiguation), multiple people
Edwin Grant (1887–1966), American politician
Effingham Grant (1820–1892), British businessman
Elihu Grant (1873–1942), American scholar
Elizabeth Grant (disambiguation), multiple people
Emma Grant (born 1991), British cyclist
Emma Grant (footballer) (born 1989), Australian footballer
Ernest Grant (born 1976), American football player
Eugene Grant (disambiguation), multiple people
Esme Grant, Jamaican politician
Eva Grant (born 1925), Greek–British figure photographer

F
Faye Grant (born 1957), American actress
F. C. Grant (1891–1974), American scholar
Frances Grant (1909–1982), American actress
Francis Grant (disambiguation), multiple people
Frank Grant (disambiguation), multiple people
Fred Grant (1891–1946), Trinidadian cricketer
Frederick Dent Grant (1850–1912), American general and diplomat
F. W. Grant (1834–1902), English scholar

G
Gabriel Grant (1826–1909), American doctor
Gareth Grant (born 1980), English footballer
Gary Martin (disambiguation), multiple people
Gavin Grant (disambiguation), multiple people
G. C. Grant (1866–1928), Canadian politician
Geoffrey Grant (disambiguation), multiple people
George Grant (disambiguation), multiple people
Gilbert Grant (1885–1972), Canadian politician
Glen Grant (disambiguation), multiple people
Glendene Grant (born 1957), Canadian human rights activist
Gogi Grant (1924–2016), American singer
Gordon Grant (disambiguation), multiple people
Grant Hackett (born 1980), Australian swimmer
Greg Grant (disambiguation), multiple people
Gregor Grant (1911–1969), Scottish artist
Guillermina Grant (born 2002), Uruguayan tennis player
Gwen Grant (born 1940), English writer
Gwendolyn Grant (artist) (1877–1968), Australian artist

H
Hamilton Grant (1872–1937), British diplomat
Hannah Simpson Grant (1798–1883), American general
Harold Grant (disambiguation), multiple people
Harry Grant (disambiguation), multiple people
Harvey Grant (born 1965), American basketball player
Heathcoat Salusbury Grant (1864–1938), English naval officer
Heber J. Grant (1856–1945), American religious leader
Hector Grant (1924–1998), Australian cricketer
Helen Grant (disambiguation), multiple people
Henry Grant (disambiguation), multiple people
Hercules Grant (born 1957), Antiguan-Canadian cricketer
Hilda Kay Grant (1910–1996), Canadian writer
Hope Grant (1808–1875), British Army officer
Horace Grant (born 1965), American basketball player
Howard Grant (disambiguation), multiple people
Hugh Grant (born 1960), British actor
Hugh J. Grant (1858–1910), American politician

I
Ian Grant (disambiguation), multiple people
Igor Grant (born 1942), American psychiatrist
Imogen Grant (born 1996), British rower
Ingrid Grant (born 1964), British skier
Isabella Grant (born 2001), Australian rules footballer
Isabelle Grant (1896–1977), American activist
Isobel Grant, Scottish noble
Isla Grant, Scottish singer-songwriter

J
Jack Grant (disambiguation), multiple people
Jackie Grant (1907–1978), West Indian cricketer
Jackie Grant (footballer) (1924–1999), English footballer
Jackson Grant (born 2002), American basketball player
Jakeem Grant (born 1992), American football player
James Grant (disambiguation), multiple people
Jamie Grant (disambiguation), multiple people
Janarion Grant (born 1993), American football player
Jane Grant (1892–1972), American publisher
Jarrad Grant (born 1989), Australian footballer
Jason Grant, American music historian
Jedediah M. Grant (1816–1856), American religious figure
Jehu Grant (1752–1840), American slave
Jenessa Grant, Canadian actress
Jenn Grant (born 1980), Canadian singer-songwriter
Jennifer Grant (born 1966), American actress
Jerai Grant (born 1989), American basketball player
Jerami Grant (born 1994), American basketball player
Jerian Grant (born 1992), American basketball player
Jerome Grant, American chef
Jerry Grant (1935–2012), American race car driver
Jerry Grant (composer) (born 1936), American composer
Jesse Root Grant (1794–1873), American farmer
Jesse Root Grant (politician) (1858–1934), American politician
Jessica Grant (born 1972), Canadian writer
Jim Grant (disambiguation), multiple people
Jimmy Grant (1918–1970), American baseball player
Joan Grant (1907–1989), English author
Joanne Grant (1930–2005), American journalist
Job Grant (1832–1910), American politician
Jodi Grant (born 1968), American activist
Joe Grant (1908–2005), American artist
John Grant (disambiguation), multiple people
Johnny Grant (disambiguation), multiple people
Johnson Grant (1773–1944), Scottish priest
Jonathan Grant (born 1993), Canadian footballer
Jono Grant (born 1969), Canadian composer
Jono Grant (DJ) (born 1979), British disc jockey
Jordan Grant (born 1991), New Zealand field hockey player
Jorge Grant (born 1994), English footballer
José Luis Grant (born 1983), Honduran footballer
Joshua Grant (disambiguation), multiple people
Joy Grant (born 1951), Belizean politician
Joyce Grant (1924–2006), English-South African actress
Julia Grant (disambiguation), multiple people
Julian Grant (born 1960), English composer
Julie Grant (born 1946), English singer
Julius Grant (1901–1991), British intelligence officer
Justin Grant (born 1991), American racing driver
J. W. Grant (born 1982), American politician

K
Kara Grant (born 1979), Canadian pentathlete
Karl Grant (born 1970), English weightlifter
Karla Grant, Australian journalist
Karlan Grant (born 1997), English footballer
Kate Grant, American activist
Katherine Grant (disambiguation), multiple people
Kathryn Grant (disambiguation), multiple people
Keki Byramjee Grant (1920–2011), Indian cardiologist
Ken Grant (born 1967), British photographer
Kenneth Grant (disambiguation), multiple people
Kerr Grant (1878–1967), Australian physicist
Kerry Grant, Australian canoeist
Keshia Grant (born 1987), New Zealand netball player
Kevin Grant (disambiguation), multiple people
Kilian Grant (born 1994), Spanish footballer
Kim Grant (disambiguation), multiple people
Kirby Grant (1911–1985), American actor
K. M. Grant (born 1958), Scottish writer

L
Lachie Grant (1923–2002), New Zealand rugby union footballer
Lachlan Grant (1871–1945), Scottish doctor
Lady Sybil Grant (1879–1955), British writer
Larry Grant (disambiguation), multiple people
Laura Grant (born 2001), Scottish cricketer
Lawrence Grant (1870–1952), English actor
Lee Grant (disambiguation), multiple people
Lemuel Grant (1817–1893), American engineer
Len Grant (1906–1938), American football player
Leroy Grant (1889–1951), American football player
Levi Grant (1810–1891), American politician
Lewis Grant (disambiguation), multiple people
Lex Grant (born 1962), Scottish footballer
Lilias Grant (??–1643/1644), Scottish writer
Linda Grant (born 1951), British journalist
Lindsay Grant (born 1964), Kittitian politician
Lindsay Grant (businessperson) (1899–1989), Trinidadian businessman
Lindy Grant (born 1952), British professor
Linn Grant (born 1999), Swedish golfer
Liz Grant (born 1930), Australian pharmacist
Lou Grant (cartoonist) (1919–2001), American cartoonist
Lourett Russell Grant, American musician
Lyonel Grant (born 1957), New Zealand sculptor

M
Maddy Grant (born 2001), Canadian rugby union footballer
Madison Grant (1865–1937), American lawyer
Malcolm Grant (disambiguation), multiple people
Marcel Grant (born 1961), British filmmaker
Margaret Grant (disambiguation), multiple people
Maria Grant (1854–1937), Canadian activist
Mark Grant (disambiguation), multiple people
Marshall Grant (1928–2011), American bassist
Mary Grant (disambiguation), multiple people
Mavis Grant (born 1948), British teacher
McKenzie Grant (1834–1897), Australian politician
M. Donald Grant (1904–1998), American sports executive
Melissa Gira Grant (born 1978), American journalist
Michael Grant (disambiguation), multiple people
Michel Grant (born 1958), Swedish judoka
Mick Grant (born 1944), English motorcycle racer
Micki Grant (1941–2021), American singer
Mike Grant (1873–1955), Canadian ice hockey player
Moray Grant (1917–1977), Scottish cinematographer
Moses Grant Jr. (1785–1861), American businessman
Mudcat Grant (1935–2021), American baseball player
Murdoch Grant (??–1830), Scottish salesman

N
Nancy Grant, French-Canadian film producer
Natalie Grant (born 1971), American singer
Neil Grant (disambiguation), multiple people
Nellie Grant (1855–1922), American social figure
Nicky Grant (born 1976), Scottish footballer
Norman Grant (disambiguation), multiple people

O
Olga Grant, Canadian baseball player
Oliver Grant (disambiguation), multiple people
Orantes Grant (born 1978), American football player
Otis Grant (born 1967), Canadian boxer
Otis Grant (American football) (1961–2011), American football player

P
Paa Grant (1878–1956), Australian merchant
Pamela Grant (born 1982), Australian footballer
Patrick Grant (disambiguation), multiple people
Paul Grant (disambiguation), multiple people
Percy Grant (disambiguation), multiple people
Perry Grant (1924–2004), American producer
Peter Grant (disambiguation), multiple people

R
Rachel Grant (born 1977), Filipino actress
Ray Grant (born 1996), Scottish footballer
Ray Grant (curler) (1934–2020), Canadian curler
Rebecca Grant (disambiguation), multiple people
Reg Grant (1914–1944), New Zealand pilot
Reg Grant (footballer) (1932–1979), Australian rules footballer
Rhoda Grant (born 1963), Scottish politician
Rhyan Grant (born 1991), Australian footballer
Rhys Grant (born 1987), Australian rower
Richard Grant (disambiguation), multiple people
Richie Grant (disambiguation), multiple people
Riley Grant (born 1995), American soccer player
Robert Grant (disambiguation), multiple people
Roddy Grant (disambiguation), multiple people
Rodney A. Grant (born 1959), American actor
Rolph Grant (1909–1977), West Indian cricketer
Rodgers Grant (1936–2012), American pianist
Roger Grant (disambiguation), multiple people
Ron Grant (disambiguation), multiple people
Ronald Grant, American corporate executive
Rosie Grant (1908–1974), American football player
Ruby Grant (born 2002), English footballer
Rupert Grant (born 1973), American football player
Russell Grant (born 1951), British astrologer
Ruth Tunstall Grant (1945–2017), American artist
Ryan Grant (disambiguation), multiple people
Rylend Grant, American screenwriter

S
Saginaw Grant (1936–2021), American actor
Sam Grant (born 1995), English cricketer
Samuel Grant (1741–1808), Jamaican slave hunter
Sandy Grant, Australian minister
Sarah D. Grant (1943–2016), American judge
Schuyler Grant (born 1970), American actress
Scott Grant (born 1944), British Army officer
Seth Grant, Australian neuroscientist
Shalita Grant (born 1988), American actress
Shannon Grant (born 1977), Australian rules footballer
Shauna Grant (1963–1984), American model
Shauntay Grant, Canadian author
Shelby Grant (1936–2011), American actress
Stan Grant (disambiguation), multiple people
Stanley Grant (1902–1993), British cinematographer
Stephen Grant (disambiguation), multiple people
Steven Grant (born 1953), American writer
Susan Grant, American novelist
Susan-Mary Grant (born 1962), American historian
Susannah Grant (born 1963), American screenwriter
Suzanne Grant (born 1984), Scottish footballer

T
Taryn Grant (born 1994), Canadian water skier
Ted Grant (1913–2006), South African politician
Terry Grant (disambiguation), multiple people
Thomas Grant (disambiguation), multiple people
Tiffany Grant (born 1968), American voice actor
Timothy Grant (disambiguation), multiple people
T. J. Grant (born 1984), Canadian mixed martial artist
Tobie Grant (1887–1968), American philanthropist
Tom Grant (disambiguation), multiple people
Toni Grant (1942–2016), American psychologist
Tony Grant (disambiguation), multiple people
Travis Grant (born 1950), American basketball player
Trevor Grant (disambiguation), multiple people
Troy Grant (born 1970), Australian politician
Trudy Grant, Canadian entertainment executive
Tylan Grant (born 2002), English actor
Tyra Grant (born 1988), American basketball player
Tyrone Grant (born 1977), American basketball player
Tzufit Grant (born 1964), Israeli actress

U
Ulysses S. Grant (disambiguation), multiple people

V
Valentine Grant (1881–1949), American actress
Valentino Grant (born 1964), Italian politician
Vanessa Grant, Canadian writer
Verne Grant (1917–2007), American botanist
Vernon Simeon Plemion Grant (1902–1990), American illustrator
Victoria Grant (born 1982), New Zealand rugby union footballer
Virginia Grant (1937–2017), Canadian swimmer

W
Waldo Grant (born 1945/1946), American serial killer
Walter Grant (disambiguation), multiple people
Wes Grant (born 1946), American football player
Wilf Grant (1920–1990), English footballer
Will Grant (born 1954), American football player
William Grant (disambiguation), multiple people
William-Pierre Grant (1872–1943), Canadian politician
Willis Grant (1907–1981), English organist
W. V. Grant (born 1946), American televangelist
Wylie Grant (1879–1968), American tennis player

Z
Zilpha Grant (1919–2011), English swimmer

Fictional characters
Dr. Alan Grant, a character in the film Jurassic Park
Alby Grant, a character on the television series Big Love
Barry Grant, a character on the soap opera Brookside
Cat Grant, a character in the comic series DC Comics
Damon Grant, a character on the soap opera Brookside
Eli Grant, a character on the soap opera Days of Our Lives
Ginger Grant, a character on the television series Gilligan's Island
Glory Grant, a character in the comic series Marvel Comics
Jo Grant, a character on television series Doctor Who
Karen Grant, a character on the soap opera Brookside
Lou Grant, a character on the television series The Mary Tyler Moore Show
Nancy Grant (All My Children), a character on the soap opera All My Children
Nicolette Grant, a character on the television series Big Love
Roman Grant, a character on the television series Big Love
Sheila Grant, a character on the soap opera Brookside
Ted Grant, a character in the comic series DC Comics
Valerie Grant, a character on the soap opera Days of Our Lives

See also
Clan Grant, a Highland Scottish clan
Grant (given name), a page for people with the given name "Grant"
Grant (disambiguation), a disambiguation page for "Grant"
Admiral Grant (disambiguation), a disambiguation page for Admirals surnamed "Grant"
General Grant (disambiguation), a disambiguation page for Generals surnamed "Grant"
Governor Grant (disambiguation), a disambiguation page for Governors surnamed "Grant"
Justice Grant (disambiguation), a disambiguation page for Justices surnamed "Grant"
President Grant (disambiguation), a disambiguation page for president surnamed "Grant"
Senator Grant (disambiguation), a disambiguation page for Senators surnamed "Grant"

References

English-language surnames
French-language surnames